David or Dave Murphy may refer to:

Sports
David Murphy (Australian rules footballer) (born 1962), Australian rules footballer
Dave Murphy (baseball) (1876–1940), American shortstop in Major League Baseball
David Murphy (baseball) (born 1981), American baseball player
David Murphy (cricketer) (born 1989), Scottish cricketer
David Murphy (footballer, born 1917) (1917–1944), English footballer
David Murphy (footballer, born 1984), English footballer
David Murphy (Laois Gaelic footballer) (born 1985), Gaelic footballer
David Murphy (Wexford Gaelic footballer), Gaelic footballer

Others
David Murphy (CIA) (1921–2014), CIA station chief in Berlin, 1959–1961
David Murphy (composer), Irish composer and harper
David Lee Murphy (born 1959), American country music singer-songwriter
David Murphy (Irish writer), Irish author
Dave Murphy (Wisconsin politician) (born 1954), American businessman and politician
David Murphy, contestant on Survivor: Redemption Island (2011)